István Kertész (later known as Stephen Denis Kertesz) (April 8, 1904–January 26, 1986) was a Hungarian diplomat who represented Hungary during the peace talks following World War II.

Biography
He was born on April 8, 1904 in Putnok, Hungary, to Lajos and Mária (Stolcz) Kertesz. He received a Dr. Jur. from the University of Budapest in 1926, and a diploma from the Institut des Hautes Etudes Internationales in Paris in 1928. During the Second World War, worked in the Hungarian Ministry of Foreign Affairs, and in 1943-1944, made efforts to convey the intentions of Admiral Miklós Horthy to surrender to the Allied powers in order to avoid further damage to the country. 

After the war, Kertész opposed the Soviet takeover of Hungary and tried to avert the Allied demand to expel the German minority from Hungary. In 1946, Kertész represented the Hungarian government at the Paris Peace Conference. 

Later, he fled Hungary and emigrated to the United States, where he lectured on diplomacy and international relations.

Works
 Stephen Kertesz, Diplomacy in a Whirlpool (Greenwood Press, London 1974, reprint of the 1953 edition)
 Stephen Kertesz, Diplomacy in a Changing World (Greenwood Press, London 1974, reprint of the 1959 edition)
 Stephen Kertesz, “The Expulsion of the Germans from Hungary: A Study in Postwar Diplomacy”, The Review of Politics, Vol. 15, no. 2 (April 1953) pp. 179–208
 Stephen Kertesz (ed.), Nuclear Non-Proliferation in a World of Nuclear Powers (Notre Dame, IN, 1967)
 Stephen Kertesz, The Last European Peace Conference, Paris 1946, Conflict of Values (Lanham, MD: University Press of America, 1985) 
 Stephen Kertesz, Between Russia and the West: Hungary and the Illusions of Peacemaking, 1945-1947 (Notre Dame, Ind.: University of Notre Dame Press, 1984)

Further reading
 Kenneth Thompson, Diplomacy and Values: The Life and Works of Stephen Kertesz in Europe and America (University Press of America, 1984)

References

1904 births
1986 deaths
Hungarian diplomats
Ambassadors of Hungary to Italy
Hungarian emigrants to the United States